Cysteine-rich secretory protein 1 is a cysteine-rich secretory protein that in humans is encoded by the CRISP1 gene.

Fertilization consists of a sequence of specific cell-cell interactions culminating in the fusion of the sperm and egg plasma membranes. Recognition, binding, and fusion occur through the interaction of complementary molecules that are localized to specific domains of the sperm and egg plasma membranes. In the sperm, the postacrosomal region or equatorial segment is involved in sperm-egg plasma membrane fusion. The protein encoded by this gene is a member of the cysteine-rich secretory protein (CRISP) family. This protein is expressed in the epididymis, is secreted into the epididymal lumen, and binds to the postacrosomal region of the sperm head where it plays a role at fertilization in sperm-egg fusion through complementary sites localized on the egg surface. Two isoforms are encoded by transcript variants of this gene.

References

External links

Further reading